The Verde Canyon Railroad is a heritage railroad running between Clarkdale and Perkinsville in the U.S. state of Arizona.

Motive power
The vintage diesel locomotives, EMD FP7s 1510 and 1512, pulling the classic passenger cars are two of only ten remaining in operation in North America. They were originally built for the Alaska Railroad in 1953 by the Electro-Motive Division of General Motors in LaGrange, Illinois. The engines debuted their eagle-inspired paint livery along these rails on March 8, 1997. Before setting out, numbers 1510 and 1512 were meticulously renovated with modern features added for safety. In 2019, these prized locomotives were imprinted with an updated paint motif and advanced mechanics.

History

The tracks on which the Verde Canyon Railroad runs were opened in 1912 as part of a north–south branch line linking a copper smelter at Clarkdale and the copper mines at Jerome to Santa Fe Railway tracks passing through Drake. The Santa Fe Railway owned and operated the  branch line from 1912 to 1988.

David L. Durbano bought the branch line in 1988. Passenger service between Clarkdale at milepost 38 and Perkinsville at milepost 18, resumed in 1990 under the name Verde Canyon Railroad. Milepost 0 of the AZCR is at Drake, where the line meets the BNSF Railway system. The AZCR track to Drake is still used for hauling freight even though the excursion line stops at Perkinsville.

Excursions involve a 4-hour,  round trip from Clarkdale to Perkinsville and back. Scenes from How the West Was Won were filmed at Perkinsville in 1960s. The route follows the Verde River, crossing bridges and trestles, and passes through a  curved tunnel. Between milepost 30 and Perkinsville, most of the land along the railroad right-of-way is in the Prescott National Forest or the Coconino National Forest (across the river).

The railroad carries about 100,000 passengers per year. In 2005 the Verde Canyon Railroad celebrated its one-millionth passenger, and the following month was named an "Arizona Treasure" by Arizona Governor Janet Napolitano.

Museum
The John Bell Railroad Museum is part of the depot complex in Clarkdale. Housed in an old boxcar, the museum displays rail artifacts and photographs, many of which came from Bell's personal collection.

See also

List of heritage railroads in the United States
List of historic properties in Clarkdale, Arizona

References

Works cited

External links
Verde Canyon Railroad
Verde Canyon Railroad VirtualTour 360º

Heritage railroads in Arizona
Museums in Yavapai County, Arizona
Prescott National Forest
Railroad museums in Arizona